San Esteban is one of seven parishes (administrative divisions) in Morcín, a municipality within the province and autonomous community of Asturias, in northern Spain.

Villages
 Castandiello
 El Palacio
 Peñanes
 La Roza
 Rozadas
 Villar
 San Esteban

References

Parishes in Morcin